Skytel Group is one of Mongolia’s leading mobile phone operators that currently holds a quarter of the mobile market.  With over 500,000 active subscribers and 400 employees of which 90% have a bachelor's degree or higher education.  The company's network functions on an HSPA+ network in Ulaanbaatar and [CDMA2000 1x] & [EVDO] network technology in the rest of the country.

Skytel has 43 branches and over 4000 retail shops across Mongolia, and their network covers another 250 counties worldwide.

Skytel Group was founded in 1999 and was a joint venture between private Mongolian and Korean firms until December 2010 when it became a 100% national enterprise with equal shareholders of Altai Holding and Shunkhlai Group. In 2011, Skytel has expanded into a group of companies through the full acquisition of Sky C&C, a well established internet, IDD, SI service provider, as well as major shares of Telemax Communications, a mobile WiMax operator, and Tengis Movie Theatre, the first modern cinema in Mongolia.  The company also owns 50% of Skynetworks, a nationwide fiber optic infrastructure operator,  and a minor share of Sky Resort, a modern ski, golf resort in Ulaanbaatar.

The company offers a variety of services including SkyMarket an e-market of cellular phones to its post-paid OPEN and Nice subscribers, as well as to its pre-paid d20, SkyPhone and SkyCall subscribers. Its headquarters are located in the center of Ulaanbaatar city, on Chinggis Khaan Avenue - 9.

History

Skytel Group was founded in May 1999 with Mongolian and Korean (SK Telecom and Taihan) joint investment. Since February 12, 2001 the company started operating on CDMA IS-95B system eventually emerging to more advanced CDMA 2000-1x technology. In 2010 the company has successfully introduced 3.75G HSPA+ network providing up to 21Mbit/s speed in wireless broadband. Skytel is expected to launch its IPTV services in summer of 2012. 
In December 2011 Mongolian business groups have acquired the Korean shares of the company making it a 100% national enterprise.
In middle of 2012, Skytel Group has expanded its CDMA 3G network to all province center. CDMA 2000 Evdo Rev.A network has been covered all province centers. Since 2012, the corenetwork systems, all telecommunications and transmission equipment, China's ZTE doors of equipment manufactured by replaced.

Operating Branches in Ulaanbaatar

Skytel Plaza
Skytel Unur
Skytel Zaluuchuud
Skytel 4 Zam
Skytel Narlag
Skytel Tengis
Skytel Sky
Skytel Sansar
Skytel Dragon
Skytel Orgil
Shine Ger /Viva city/

Operating Branches in other areas
Arhangai
Bayan-Ulgii
Baganuur
Bayanhongor
Bor Undur
Bulgan
Govi-Altai
Govisumber
Darhan
Dornod
Dundgovi
Zavhan
Zuun Haraa
Nalaih
Uvurhangai
Umnugobi
Sainshand
Selenge
Sukhbaatar
Tarialan
Toson Tsengel
Tuv
Uvs
Uyanga
Harhorin
Hovd
Huvsgul
Hujirt
Hentii
Erdenet
Hanbogd
Tsogttsetsii

External links
Official Site

References

Telecommunications companies of Mongolia
Companies based in Ulaanbaatar